The 1905–06 Challenge Cup was the 10th staging of rugby league's oldest knockout competition, the Challenge Cup.

The final was contested by Bradford F.C. and Salford at Headingley, Leeds in front of a crowd of 15,834 on Saturday 28 April 1906. Bradford won the Cup in their first appearance in the final by a score of 5-0.

Intermediate round
The intermediate, or qualifying, round matches were played on 17 February 1906.

Replays
The two replays were played on 24 February 1906.

First round

Replay
The replayed fixture was played on 7 March 1906.

Second round
Second round fixtures were played on 17 March 1906.

Replay

Third round
The third round fixtures were played on 31 March 1906.

Replays
The two drawn matches were replayed the following week. Halifax played Bradford on 3 April with Broughton Rangers v Salford played on 4 April.

The Broughton v Salford tie required a second replay to decide the fixture and this was played at Wigan on 6 April.

Semi-finals
The semi-finals were played at neutral venues on 14 April 1906.

Final

References

External links
Challenge Cup official website 
Challenge Cup 1905/06 results at Rugby League Project

Challenge Cup
Challenge Cup